Witchcliffe is a small town in the South West region of Western Australia, located a few kilometres south of Margaret River on the Bussell Highway. The name originates from a cave in the area, Witchcliffe cave, that was recorded by a surveyor in 1900. It is believed the name was given by the Bussell family whose property, Wallcliffe, was established in the area in the 1850s.

History
In 1924 the government extended the Flinders Bay Branch Railway to Witchcliffe. The siding was to be named Narawary but a post office already existed at the site with the name Witchcliffe, having opened in 1923, so the siding was named Witchcliffe in 1925. Lots were surveyed and sold along the siding in 1924 and the townsite was gazetted in 1926.

The town was built around the timber industry, with the Witchcliffe sawmill being built in 1922 just east of town for the  W.A. Jarrah Forests Ltd, which was taken over by the Adelaide Timber company in 1929.

Climate

References 

Towns in Western Australia
South West (Western Australia)
Timber towns in Western Australia